In graph theory, the tree-depth of a connected undirected graph  is a numerical invariant of , the minimum height of a Trémaux tree for a supergraph of . This invariant and its close relatives have gone under many different names in the literature, including vertex ranking number, ordered chromatic number, and minimum elimination tree height; it is also closely related to the cycle rank of directed graphs and the star height of regular languages.  Intuitively, where the treewidth of a graph measures how far it is from being a tree, this parameter measures how far a graph is from being a star.

Definitions

Another definition is the following:

This definition mirrors the definition of cycle rank of directed graphs, which uses strong connectivity and strongly connected components in place of undirected connectivity and connected components.

Tree-depth may also be defined using a form of graph coloring. A centered coloring of a graph is a coloring of its vertices with the property that every connected induced subgraph has a color that appears exactly once. Then, the tree-depth is the minimum number of colors in a centered coloring of the given graph.

Finally, one can define this in terms of a pebble game, or more precisely as a cops and robber game.  Consider the following game, played on an undirected graph.  There are two players, a robber and a cop.  The robber has one pebble he can move along the edges of the given graph.  The cop has an unlimited number of pebbles, but she wants to minimize the amount of pebbles she uses.  The cop cannot move a pebble after it has been placed on the graph.  The game proceeds as follows.  The robber places his pebble.  The cop then announces where she wants to place a new cop pebble.  The robber can then move his pebble along edges, but not through occupied vertices.  The game is over when the cop player places a pebble on top of the robber pebble.  The tree-depth of the given graph is the minimum number of pebbles needed by the cop to guarantee a win.  For a star graph, two pebbles suffice: the strategy is to place a pebble at the center vertex, forcing the robber to one arm, and then to place the remaining pebble on the robber.  For a path with  vertices, the cop uses a binary search strategy, which guarantees that at most  pebbles are needed.

Examples

The tree-depth of a complete graph equals its number of vertices. For, in this case, the only possible forest  for which every pair of vertices are in an ancestor-descendant relationship is a single path. A forest achieving this  bound may be constructed by forming a path for the smaller side of the bipartition, with each vertex on the larger side of the bipartition forming a leaf in  connected to the bottom vertex of this path.

The tree-depth of a path with  vertices is exactly .

Depth of trees and relation to treewidth
Any -vertex forest has tree-depth . For, in a forest, one can always find a constant number of vertices the removal of which leaves a forest that can be partitioned into two smaller subforests with at most  vertices each. By recursively partitioning each of these two subforests, one can easily derive a logarithmic upper bound on the tree-depth. Since outerplanar graphs, series–parallel graphs, and Halin graphs all have bounded treewidth, they all also have at most logarithmic tree-depth. The typical graphs with large treedepth and small treewidth are the perfect binary trees and the paths. Precisely, there is a constant  with the following property: if a graph has treedepth at least  and treewidth less than  then it contains a perfect binary tree with height  or a path of length  as a minor.

In the other direction, the treewidth of a graph is at most equal to its tree-depth. More precisely, the treewidth is at most the pathwidth, which is at most one less than the tree-depth.

Graph minors
Tree-depth is monotonic under minors: every minor of a graph  has tree-depth at most equal to the tree-depth of  itself. Thus, by the Robertson–Seymour theorem, for every fixed  the set of graphs with tree-depth at most  has a finite set of forbidden minors.

If  is a class of graphs closed under taking graph minors, then the graphs in  have tree-depth  if and only if  does not include all the path graphs.
More precisely, there is a constant  such that every graph of treedepth at least  contains one of the following minors (each of treedepth at least ): 
 the  grid,
 the complete binary tree of height ,
 the path of order .

Induced subgraphs
As well as behaving well under graph minors, tree-depth has close connections to the theory of induced subgraphs of a graph. Within the class of graphs that have tree-depth at most  (for any fixed integer ), the relation of being an induced subgraph forms a well-quasi-ordering.

Well-quasi-ordering implies that any property of graphs that is monotonic with respect to induced subgraphs has finitely many forbidden induced subgraphs, and therefore may be tested in polynomial time on graphs of bounded tree-depth. The graphs with tree-depth at most  themselves also have a finite set of forbidden induced subgraphs.

Complexity
Computing tree-depth is computationally hard: the corresponding decision problem is NP-complete. The problem remains NP-complete for bipartite graphs , as well as for chordal graphs.

On the positive side, tree-depth can be computed in polynomial time on interval graphs, as well as on permutation, trapezoid, circular-arc, circular permutation graphs, and cocomparability graphs of bounded dimension.  For undirected trees, tree-depth can be computed in linear time.

If not, the shallow depth first search tree can be used to construct a tree decomposition with bounded width, and standard dynamic programming techniques for graphs of bounded treewidth can be used to compute the depth in linear time.

It is also possible to compute the tree-depth exactly, for graphs whose tree-depth may be large, in time  for a constant  slightly smaller than 2.

Notes

References
.

.
.
.
.
.

.
.
.
.
.
.
.

Graph coloring
Graph invariants
Graph minor theory